Jo Herbst (1928–1980) was a German film and television actor.

Selected filmography
 The Big Star Parade (1954)
 The Captain and His Hero (1955)
 Heroism after Hours (1955)
 Teenage Wolfpack (1956)
 Confessions of Felix Krull (1957)
 Rosemary (1958)
 Peter Shoots Down the Bird (1959)
 We Cellar Children (1960)

References

Bibliography
 Hardy, Phil. The BFI Companion to Crime. A&C Black, 1997.

External links

1928 births
1980 deaths
German male film actors
German male television actors
20th-century German male actors
Male actors from Berlin